is a railway station on the JR East Tsugaru Line located in the city of Aomori, Aomori Prefecture, Japan.

Lines

Station layout
Hidariseki Station has one side platform serving a single bi-directional track. The station is unattended. There is no station building, but only a weather shelter on the platform.

History
Hidariseki Station was opened on November 25, 1959 as a station on the Japanese National Railways (JNR). With the privatization of the JNR on April 1, 1987, it came under the operational control of JR East.

Surrounding area

See also
 List of railway stations in Japan

External links

 

Stations of East Japan Railway Company
Railway stations in Aomori Prefecture
Tsugaru Line
Aomori (city)
Railway stations in Japan opened in 1959